This is a list of museums in Saudi Arabia.

Museums in Saudi Arabia

Al Bassam Heritage House
Clock Tower Museum
Dar Al Madinah Museum
Darat Safeya Bizagr
Hafouf National Museum
Hejaz Railway Museum
Humane Heritage Museum
Jadeah Museum
Jeddah Regional Museum of Archaeology and Ethnography
Al-Jouf Museum of Archaeology and Folklore
King Abdulaziz Historical Center
Al-Madina Museum
Mada'in Saleh
Masmak fort
Nasseef House
National Museum of Saudi Arabia
Royal Saudi Air Force Museum
Al-Salam Museum
Shadda Palace
Sharif Museum
Tabuk Castle
Tayybat Museum
The Two Holy Mosques Architecture Exhibition
Al-Zaher Palace Museum

See also

 List of museums
 Tourism in Saudi Arabia

Museums

Lists of buildings and structures in Saudi Arabia
Saudi Arabia
Lists of tourist attractions in Saudi Arabia
Saudi Arabia